Óscar Rivas Viondi (born 27 March 2000) is a Spanish footballer who plays as a central defender for AD Alcorcón.

Club career
Born in Albacete, Castilla–La Mancha, Rivas was a Getafe CF youth graduate, after starting out at Atlético Madrid. On 17 July 2019, after finishing his formation, he signed for Tercera División side CD Móstoles URJC.

Rivas made his senior debut on 25 August 2019, starting in a 2–3 home loss against AD Torrejón CF. He scored his first goal on 3 November, netting his team's third in a 4–0 home routing of CD Paracuellos Antamira.

In July 2021, Rivas moved to AD Alcorcón and was assigned to the reserves in the Tercera División RFEF. He made his first-team debut on 15 December, starting in a 1–2 extra time away loss against Sporting de Gijón in the season's Copa del Rey.

Rivas scored his first professional goal on 27 March 2022, netting his team's only in a 1–2 home loss against Real Valladolid. On 21 April, he renewed his contract until 2024, with an option for another two years.

Personal life
Rivas' twin brother Mario is also a footballer; a forward, he was also groomed at Getafe. Their father Antonio was also a footballer.

References

External links
AD Alcorcón profile 

2000 births
Living people
Sportspeople from Albacete
Spanish twins
Twin sportspeople
Spanish footballers
Footballers from Castilla–La Mancha
Association football defenders
Segunda División players
Tercera División players
Tercera Federación players
CD Móstoles URJC players
AD Alcorcón B players
AD Alcorcón footballers